Drue Drury may refer to:

 Sir Drue Drury (courtier) (?1531–1617)
 Sir Drue Drury, 1st Baronet (1588–1632), MP for Thetford and Norfolk
 Sir Drue Drury, 2nd Baronet (1611–1647), of the Drury baronets

See also
 Dru Drury (1725–1804), British entomologist